Dedebit is remote, lowland terrain in the North Western zone of the Tigray Region of Ethiopia, which has become a small town. It is known for being the place where the Tigray People's Liberation Front (TPLF), the armed movement that overthrew the Derg military dictatorship, was formed.

On 7 January 2022, at least 56 people were killed by an Ethiopian Air Force airstrike on an IDP camp.

References

Populated places in the Tigray Region